Humankind: A Hopeful History is a 2019 non-fiction book by Dutch historian Rutger Bregman. It was published by Bloomsbury in May 2021. It argues that people are decent at heart and proposes a new worldview based on the corollaries of this optimistic view of human beings. It argues against popular ideas of humankind's essential egotism and malevolence. It engages in a multi-disciplinary study of historical events, an examination of scientific studies, and philosophical argumentation to advance Bregman's opinion that, contrary to popular opinion, this outlook is more realistic than its more negative counterpart. It has been translated into over 30 languages. In the United States, the paperback release was a New York Times Best Seller.

Summary 
Humankind argues that humans are fundamentally decent and that more recognition of this view would likely benefit everyone, as cynical expectations of others lead them to become cynical actors themselves. If society were less adamant about the belief that humans are naturally lazy, there would be less reason to oppose the widespread introduction of poverty mitigation measures like basic income. The book takes a multi-disciplinary approach, drawing from history, economics, psychology, biology, anthropology, and archaeology findings. It also uses the state of nature debate between Jean-Jacques Rousseau and Thomas Hobbes as a framing device, siding with Rousseau's position on the matter.

Prologue: Civilian Resilience After Bombing 
During World War II, before the London Blitz and the Allied counter-bombings over critical German cities, it was thought aerial bombardments would sow panic and chaos among the population, breaking their will. World leaders such as Adolf Hitler, Joseph Stalin, and Winston Churchill read Psychologie des foule by French psychologist Gustave Le Bon, which argued extreme hardship would make people return to their uncivilized and selfish nature. Contrary to these expectations, the British high command found no sign of mass panic after the German bombings of London. Despite this, the British military maintained that "the will of a people could be broken by bombings", defending this belief in the face of the evidence by insisting that British citizens possessed a unique character required to handle the stress of bombardment. The German people, by contrast, were said to lack the fortitude necessary to withstand.

After the war, British psychiatrists visited bombed German cities and found none of the expected traumatic cases. Instead, an increase in the quality of mental health had been found. Moreover, there was a drop in alcohol consumption and suicide attempts. Rather than revert to barbarism as many had expected, civilians of both nations became more altruistic in those dire times. The failure of military command, including Winston Churchill, who "until the final few months of the war... remained convinced that it was best to bomb civilians", to recognize the reality revealed to them by new evidence resulted in the vast majority of Allied bombing runs wasting their ammunition, time, and lives on targets who would never break instead of on factories that would.

A New Realism 
Bregman here explicitly advances his core thesis that "most people are decent". This idea "seems to have been denied at every turn in the annals of history", including now. That this belief is unpopular has been shown by the research of Tom Postmes, professor of social psychology at the University of Groningen. His studies present people with the hypothetical situation of a plane crash and asks participants to choose which way they believe their fellow victims may behave in the immediate aftermath. If we live on "Planet A," we should expect to see people banding together and helping one another through the crisis. If we live on "Planet B," we should expect to see people panic and turn on one another as they desperately try to secure their own safety. Most participants believe that we live on Planet B, while the evidence overwhelmingly suggests we live on Planet A. That people continue to maintain their belief that the world we live in is a Planet B type in the face of such evidence strongly suggests that "the idea that people are naturally egotistical, panicky, and aggressive is a pernicious myth". It also presents the problem of determining why this myth is still believed. Bregman's answer is that cynicism, the belief that we live on Planet B, conditions people to expect others to have cynical motives regardless of their actions. We see the evil we expect to see: a nocebo. This nocebo effect is exacerbated by class and power distinctions, with the "elites" projecting their own selfishness onto the masses.

This played out during Hurricane Katrina, where town leaders not only reported to the public that the city of New Orleans was overrun with cases of rapes and killings but proceeded to act on these reportings. Afterward, researchers found that "the city was flooded with courage and charity" instead of the ghoulish behavior the authorities reported had occurred. The only killings that occurred were at the hands of National Guardsmen, sent in to stop the killings that were not happening. Similar patterns have been seen around the world by the Disaster Research Center. In nearly 700 case studies, their research has yielded no evidence of mass panic. However, ample evidence was found of widespread, spontaneous acts of altruism between victims. It is always the authorities, not the citizens, who act selfishly. Bregman writes, "aid response started excruciatingly slowly because the responders didn't dare enter the city without guards." Many people believe that others would act cruelly during a catastrophe because the elite class disseminates their cyclical worldview through the news, whose emphasis on negative and sensational stories obscures the mundane reality of human kindness.

The Real "Lord of the Flies" 
In 1954, British schoolteacher William Golding penned his now famous novel Lord of the Flies, depicting the partly natural and partly self-inflicted struggles endured by a party of English schoolchildren who find themselves stranded on a deserted island and quickly turn on one another out of selfishness. Often turned to today as a poetic expression of the ultimately realistic truth that, when push comes to shove, all the niceties people put on in their daily lives will fall away and, free to now express their otherwise repressed inner demons, people will devolve into little more than bloodthirsty brutes, instruments of their own destruction. Compelling a story it may be, Bregman argues, it is a work of fiction and should be treated as such. When we search for real-life examples of stories like Lord of the Flies unfolding, we discover a very different image of what humanity turns into when freed from the shackles of civilization. 

Bregman describes the true story of Tongan schoolboys shipwrecked on the deserted island of ʻAta with few resources and no adult supervision. Bregman was able to track down the captain of the fishing boat who rescued the boys, Peter Warner, son of Australian businessman Arthur Warner, and one of the rescued individuals, Mano Totau. He interviewed Warner and got the full story of the boys' ordeal and rescue, including that Warner hired all of them as crew members for his fishing boat. In sharp contrast to the prediction by Lord of the Flies, the children immediately came up with rules to govern their conduct and ensure cooperation. A division of labor was set up, respective to each boy's strengths and weaknesses. When arguments and disputes broke out, those involved would separate themselves from one another, returning only once they had calmed down and could engage in good faith to resolve the matter. "By the time we arrived,' captain Peter wrote in his memoirs, 'they had set up a small commune with a vegetable garden and hollowed out stumps to collect rainwater, a sports area with unusual weights, a badminton field, chicken coops, and a permanent fire.'" When one of the boys, Steven, fell from a height and broke his leg, the others rushed to provide him with medical care. After the rescue, medical professionals were impressed with the general health of the boys, including Steven whose leg had fully recovered.

An excerpt of this chapter was later published by The Guardian in May 2020. It was also made into an episode of 60 Minutes.

Part I: The Natural State of Being 
Since the beginning of the discipline, philosophers have debated whether humans tend toward good or evil. The most famous of these thinkers, on opposing sides, are Thomas Hobbes and Jean-Jacques Rousseau. Hobbes maintained that civilization suppressed the bad in humanity, Rousseau that it undermined the good. Hobbes believed that man is driven by fear of the other and of death and that we are, therefore, constantly at war with each other. But there was a way to escape this fate: "we must put our souls in the hands of a single absolute sovereign." This mode of thinking would be "repeated millions of times by directors and dictators, politicians and generals: 'give us power, or things will go wrong!'" Rousseau, on the other hand, believed that civilization was a mistake. "Agriculture, city, and state did not save us from chaos and anarchy, but subjugated and damned us." This mode of thinking would be "repeated millions of times by anarchists and libertines, rebels and insurgents." These thinkers have had a long-lasting effect on our society, with Hobbes' egotistical human influencing economics and Rousseau's notion of the noble savage influencing child pedagogy and developmental psychology. But whereas Hobbes and Rousseau were working with hypotheticals and theories, "we have decades of scientific evidence" on which to draw.

The Rise of Homo Puppy 
Despite the species' remarkably young age, humankind has managed to spread to virtually every corner of the globe. We could once attribute our success to divine intervention, humanity having been designated stewards of Earth by God. This view is often not accepted even among the religious, and the secular among us have long struggled to find a satisfactory alternative answer for humanity's success. The uncomfortable truth suggested by the theory of evolution is that our success is merely the result of our species' insatiable greed and incomparable selfishness, a ruthlessness no other animal can match. Or so biologists like Richard Dawkins claim. Bregman, however, not only finds the answer of selfishness unpersuasive, he finds it inadequate in its own terms.

The Machiavellian theory states that people can only expect to be successful in life if they are willing to be cutthroat in society, stepping on who they must and deceiving who they wish. While there is some truth to this argument within civilized communities, it only explains the success of individual actors within the species' social hierarchy. The species' success as a collective cannot come from its ability to turn on one another. If this somehow were the origin of human success, it would be difficult to explain our fellow primates' relative lack of success. Chimpanzees, for example, consistently perform far better than humans in games of deceit.

All else being equal, people want to trust and cooperate with others. Far more than selfishness, this is the distinctly human quality that gave us an evolutionary edge. Where other primates are capable of deceit, humans struggle with it. Our eyes have prominent whites, allowing others to see where our attention is directed. We are the only species that blushes, letting others know our emotions, sometimes against our will. These are not traits that would have developed if our competitive edge had come from concealing our true thoughts from one another; instead, they would have almost certainly been selected against.

Drawing on the famous research on animal domestication conducted by Russian naturalist Dmitry Belyayev, Bregman suggests that humanity is a species that has domesticated itself. In his experiments, Belyayev selected friendly silver foxes to breed with one another, discounting any other trait they may possess. At the start, "friendliness" could only be defined as a hesitation toward violence. Within four generations, the foxes began wagging their tails like household dogs. In just a few generations more, the foxes started to beg for attention from their tamers.

Just as importantly for Belyayev's research, certain physical traits developed alongside friendliness. First noticed by Darwin, there are certain physical traits common to all domesticated animals. "For starters, they're a few sizes smaller than their wild forebears. They have smaller brains and teeth and often floppy ears, curly tails, or white-spotted fur. Perhaps most interesting of all, they retain some juvenile traits their whole lives." Despite not factoring into the selection process, these traits all began to appear in the domesticated silver wolves, resulting in the first evidence of what is today known as domestication syndrome.

Beylayev's most radical theory, which Bregman endorses, was that humankind shows signs of domestication syndrome. Given that another species has not domesticated us, there remains only one suspect: ourselves. "Our bodies have become much softer, more youthful, and more feminine" compared to early hominids like neanderthals. According to Beylayev, the kindest people bred most often among early humans, not cruel or domineering ones. We lived in a state of "survival of the friendliest." We are, Bregman says, Homo Puppy.

Building on this connection to animals, we return to the original problematic of the chapter: what gave humanity its evolutionary age? The answer may be found in research on actual puppies. American researcher Brian Hare, a specialist in the study of canines, was involved in a "classic object-choice test" measuring infant chimpanzees' intelligence and human toddlers' intelligence. Intended in jest, Hare claimed that his dog could perform better than the chimpanzees. When other researchers balked at his claim, Hare set out to prove himself correct. After many tests, he was able to prove just that. The curious thing is that wolves perform just as poorly in these tests as chimpanzees, prompting interest in investigating the reasons for the difference.

Hare's colleague Richard Wrangham suggested that social intelligence was the by-product of selecting for something else. Hare refused this answer because nothing so important could have been selected by accident. Pursuing this line of questioning, Hare flew out to Siberia to meet with the silver fox domestication program. Much to his surprise, he discovered that the domesticated foxes were not merely social but supremely intelligent. Until this point, scientists believed domestication made animals less intelligent rather than more.

The idea that humans are self-domesticated animals would seem here to gain credence. Bregman writes that, on social intelligence tests, "[m]ost children score 100, most chimps and orangutans 0. Humans turn out to be hypersocial learning machines." The ability of human beings to not only accumulate knowledge but disseminate it with ease is what allowed humanity to pull ahead of its competitors. The ability to get along with others, to contribute to and draw from a collective pool of information, allowed humanity to develop its intelligence cross-generationally. In contrast, individual members of other species would have to start from scratch.

Contrary to suggestions made by some sensationalist scholars, there exists scant evidence that the Neanderthals were wiped out in a brutal genocide at the hands of our early ancestors. Instead, they likely died out in the Ice Age. We, unlike them, survived because "our cooperative skills made us more resilient." While it is true that natural selection often takes the form of inter-species conflict, it just as often comes down to the ability of a species to stand against adverse environmental factors. Here cooperation is vital, and it is here where humans are uniquely successful. And while it is true that the universe is indifferent to our plight, other people are not. "Maybe our existence is a bizarre coincidence after millions of years of blind evolution. But at least we're not alone. We have each other."

Colonel Marshall and the Soldiers Who Wouldn't Fight 
That humanity is a social creature may establish a basis for a belief that pro-social actions constitute a part of human essence, but it fails to rule out anti-social acts as part of that essence. The chemical oxytocin, once touted as the chemical of love, has been since shown to not only increase affection for those one knows. It also increases hostility toward strangers. Hobbes never denied the capacity for human beings to band together or even to care for one another as a community; he denied that humanity as a species could do so. The properties of oxytocin would seem to suggest Hobbes was correct, as does an even cursory knowledge of the history of human civilizations. And if he were right, we would expect to see archeological evidence of this being the case. And we do. Famously, Anatomist Raymond Dart examined the remains of a 2 or 3 million-year-old hominid in 1924 and declared its cause of death to be of human origin. Not only was this person's death at the hands of a fellow human, but Dart would also find many remains from the same period to have died in the same manner. Biologist Jane Goodall, who spent decades studying chimpanzees in Tanzania, reported on the all-out chimp war in which two groups murdered members of the opposing group, which lasted an astounding four years.

But, Homo sapiens are not early hominids, nor are we chimpanzees. What is true of them is not necessarily true for us by proxy. Instead of looking to learn from the behavior of our relatives, we should turn to the study of hunter-gatherer societies. In 1959, anthropologist Elisabeth Marshall Thomas wrote a book about the !Kung people titled The Harmless People recounting her encounters with their community. Most famously, she wrote of a conflict involving the !Kung, where battles primarily consisted of swears and insults, ending when anyone was physically injured. As promising as such a find was, other anthropologists quickly contradicted it. Napoleon Chagnon's seminal The Fierce People is about the Yanomamö tribe, who are allegedly locked in a "constant warlike state." Perhaps more importantly, he discovered that men who killed more tended to have more children, showing war to be natural and, perhaps, naturally selective. Such anthropology was cemented in popular consciousness by neuroscientist Steven Pinker in his 2011 bestseller The Better Angels of Our Nature.

The fallout of this narrative, that human beings have forever been violent at the core, is that humans today are ultimately violent at heart. Could a better example of this than warfare be found? It is here where people not only kill, but are ordered to—paid to. World War II colonel Samuel Lyman Atwood Marshall discovered that if no better example could be found, no example could be found at all. Rather than showing a propensity for violence, the vast majority of even professional soldiers will refuse to fire their firearms even while their lives are under threat on the battlefield. Other army officers noticed the same phenomenon. "After the Second World War, historians started to interview veterans, and it turned out over half of them never killed anyone." Evidence of similar behavior historically has been found, too, with Confederate muskets recovered after the end of the American Civil War. Of the over 27,000 muskets uncovered after the American Civil War, 90% were loaded. Loading takes up about 95% of the time in musket warfare and shooting only 5%, so it is "notable that so many guns were fully loaded. It gets weirder. About 12,000 muskets were doubly loaded, and half of those triply so. One of the guns had 23 bullets in the barrel!" Historians later realized that "reloading was the perfect excuse not to shoot."

Just as we find reluctance in violence today and in recent history, anthropologists have discovered new and re-examined old evidence, leading them to conclusions that contradict older work drastically. By their very nature, anthropological studies of present communities 'contaminate' the object of their research, but the degree of contamination is variable. Few societies are as contaminated as the Yanomamö that Chagnon studied for his book; he gave them axes and machetes for their cooperation in his studies. The Yanomamö found his contamination so undesirable that he was banned from the tribe in 1995. In his dubious honor, a new word, "anthro," entered their lexicon, meaning a particularly evil man. Chagnon's findings that warriors who killed more had more children has been since debunked, Chagnon's calculations failing to account for the fact that those who killed more also tended to be older and hence have had more time to have children.

Steven Pinker's opus has proven equally flawed. Pinker's work primarily examined hybrid cultures that settled in a single place. Agriculture and horse domestication are recent inventions, ten thousand and five thousand years old, respectively, so cultures engaged in these activities are not representative of our fifty thousand-year-old ancestors. Even then, Pinker used too broad a definition for 'casualties of war,' with the majority of the dead dying at the hands of outsiders from civilized cultures. Rather than showing these people to be violent, Pinker shows they have been victims of the very civilization his work set out to champion.

When studying nomadic cultures, anthropologists today have come to very different conclusions than Chagnon and Pinker. "Nomads prefer to solve conflicts by talking them through or moving to the next valley." They are also highly social: "They constantly eat and party, sing and marry with people from other groups." While the hunting parties are limited in size, they consist of friends rather than family and have fluid membership. Consequently, nomads meet an estimated 1000 people in a lifetime, with strangers regularly incorporated into the group peaceably. A hand of friendship rather than a sword of war is the greeting of the nomad.

Ultimately, even nomadic tribes today are not comparable to those before us. While contamination in anthropological studies is variable, it is inevitable thanks to modern civilization's omnipresence. A researcher can only minimize, never avoid. By definition, nomadic peoples have few possessions and so leave behind little evidence of their existence. What we do find, however, is telling. In cave art, prehistoric peoples immortalized their most extraordinary deeds and desires. Never did such peoples feel the need to immortalize warfare, strongly suggesting it did not exist. Evidence for violent deaths in the archaeological records is also wanting, with 20 of the 21 excavations cited in Pinker's book dating to some time after the domestication of the horse, the advent of agriculture, or a permanent settlement. There are no signs of battles in the roughly 400 sites that are old enough to tell us about humans pre-civilization.

The Curse of Civilization 
"It must have been a massive shock for so-called barbarian people to come into contact with 'civilized' colonists. For some, even the thought that you could murder someone must have been bizarre". Societies of this sort still exist today, such as the island of Ifalik in the Pacific. Our ancestors have not been without violence, and it's unlikely that  "Homo Puppy" could have conquered the world as a pacifist: the question remains whether this violence constitutes an expression of human essence or a perversion of it. American cultural anthropologist Christopher Boehm examined 339 field studies of hunter-gatherer groups and concluded that these people uniformly and emphatically valued equality. "If nomads even allowed power imbalances, they were temporary and based on content, what scientists call 'achievement-based inequality.'" While Bregman is clear that vanity and greed are not new phenomena, their cultural acceptance and systematic encouragement are. By not settling down permanently, hunter-gatherers lacked the social organization form necessary for private property. Lacking inheritance, the accumulation of generational wealth was also an impossibility. Bregman states, "aggressive personalities had fewer opportunities to reproduce, while more amiable types had more offspring. For most of human history, then, men and women were more or less equal." This equality between the sexes allowed men to spend more time with their children than the average father today. The active presence of women in the community allowed for a larger pool of people from which one may draw knowledge and hence was evolutionarily advantageous.

The radicality of the equality present in these early communities undermines the claims made today by those seeking to defend the legitimacy of societal authority figures. That those in positions of authority advance these positions is not surprising, but the willingness of the average person to parrot the idea is. It may be suggested that people repeat this idea simply because it is correct, but is that the case? "After all, there are numerous examples of humans building temples, or even entire cities, without conforming to any strict hierarchy." The Göbekli Tepe, a massive temple-complex in south Turkey, was built by hunter-gatherers in what is known as a 'collective work event.' "Pilgrims came from far and wide to contribute. Afterward, they had a great feast, where countless gazelles were roasted." Evidence for prehistoric rules does exist, but is so rare that it is generally accepted that they were few and far between and lasted for a very short period of time before being deposed.

This age of equality ended when the world emerged from the Ice Age and humans began establishing permanent settlements. Uncoincidentally, this is when evidence for the first wars begins to appear. Far from being an eternal part of the makeup of human life, wars only started in the very recent history of our species. Permanent settlements provided the context necessary for private property, which in turn provided the circumstances needed for inheritance and the generational accumulation of wealth, whose required protection provided justification for permanent leadership. Wars became tools by which leaders could accrue prestige and secure their position atop society. Like Rousseau before him, Bregman sees this as humanity's greatest mistake. Many theologians agree, believing the Biblical Fall to be a metaphorical telling of how humankind came to separate itself needlessly from the freely given bounty of nature. Religious convictions became less unitary and instead stressed the division between ourselves and the divine, often with this separation taking on an explicitly hostile character. The primary purpose of the religious life ceased to be harmony with the universe and became the appeasement of a fickle band of superhumans. It is no coincidence, says Bregman that the Old Testament's characterization of cities is uniformly negative, describing them as dens of sin which were to be avoided at all costs.

When our ancestors took up farming, they did so because it was easier in the short term. Unfortunately, they failed to account for population growth and the increase in labor it would demand: "the numbers of wild animals declined [and] agriculture had to be practiced on land without fertile silt." At this point, humanity was trapped. Those who resisted did not survive. "Towns were subjugated by cities, and cities were devoured by provinces. In the course of world history, the constant pressure of war led societies to scale up. Eventually, this led to the final disaster that Rousseau would also write about: The birth of the state." Unlike our ancestors, however, we have the advancements of modern technology and industry; these will no more turn back the clock than anything else, but they can push the clock forward and set us down a better path. We may be unable to return to hunter-gatherer communities, but neither must we live in hyper-atomized technocratic societies either. "We don't have to be fatalistic about society like Rousseau was. The curse can be lifted. We can rearrange our field and animal agriculture, our cities and states, so they bring prosperity for all."

The Mystery of Easter Island 
As it will never be entirely possible to be completely sure what prehistoric life was for those who lived it, Bregman suggests that an example of what happens when a population finds itself isolated on an island for centuries may be illustrative. On Easter Sunday, April 5th, 1722, the Dutch explorer Jacob Roggeveen stumbled on what today is known to those in the Anglosphere as Easter Island. While he and his men saw that the island was populated, they were unsure how those people arrived there as they saw no seaworthy boats, and the island was 2500 km away from peopled lands. Thanks to DNA research, it is now known that Polynesians, likely lost at sea, founded the island nation.

British anthropologist Katherine Routledge visited the island in 1914, at which point she discovered that the famed Maoi, massive monoliths sculpted in honor of respected leaders, had been pulled down and left to decay, whereas they were in pristine condition at the time of Roggeveen's visit. When asking about the people's history, Routledge was told of a terrible war between two factions, which ended with one of the groups being burned to death in a trench. In 1955, Norwegian explorer Thor Heyerdahl put together an expedition to Easter Island. His crew included several respected scientists, including anthropologist William Mulloy. The team found signs suggesting that the island was once covered in trees, and slowly the team believed they had solved the mystery of Easter Island.

The story was, according to Mulloy, that tribal chiefs had entered into a quasi-arms race, demanding larger and larger Moai be made in tribute to their greatness. An ever-increasing number of trees needed to be cut down to move the massive stones, and after all the trees were gone, the soil eroded and became less bountiful. The lack of trees meant it was difficult to build canoes, so their capacity for fishing diminished significantly. The people were forced to compete among themselves over the few remaining resources; war was all but inevitable. When it did, it led to the battle Katherine Routledge discovered. After that, the inhabitants started toppling the Moai and became cannibals. They even found countless obsidian spear tips, known as mata'a. By the time Routledge arrived, the island's population had dwindled to numbers lower than those present when Jacob Roggeveen had visited.

Jared Diamond, an American geographer well known for his works of popular anthropology, wrote about the fate of the island in the 2005 book Collapse. In his telling, closely following Mulloy's version of events, Easter Island was populated for the first time in 900 by the Marquesas group, and, at one point, the island was home to over 15,000 people, an estimate significantly higher than those generally accepted by scholars in the field. Constructing Maoi required not only great efforts but many trees, ultimately resulting in deforestation. The following starvation provoked war in 1680 and cannibalism, which was still practiced during the time of Roggeveen's expedition in 1722. The story was a perfect illustration of the inherent follies of man and proved the necessity of wise governance to avoid such ends.

While Bregman was at one point persuaded by Diamond's history and the lessons drawn therefrom, his opinion changed upon learning "about the work of Jan Boersema." Boersema, an ecologist, became curious about the story of the Maoi and, while researching the subject, began to wonder if Roggeveen's journal of the trip was still available. Within 30 minutes, he had it and found that the events as told by him contradicted the story being spun by modern anthropologists drastically. Where Boersema began the reading expecting to find tales of cannibalism and barbarism, he instead learned of a community of generous islanders in good spirits. With new evidence in hand, Boersema became skeptical of the traditional narrative.

After digging, he found little evidence of warfare, "only two skulls show damage that could theoretically be caused by the notorious mata'a", and no proof for the claim of cannibalism. Commonly cited quotes from British explorer James Cook were revealed to be a hoax, invented whole cloth by Norwegian explorer Thor Heyerdahl in the 20th century. With warfare and cannibalism all but ruled out, a new answer needed to be provided for the drop in population claimed by Diamond. The explanation was simple: the population hadn't dropped at all. The calculations used by Diamond to determine the original people were deeply flawed. Recent evidence suggests 1100 as more accurate a settlement date, 200 years later than Diamond theorized. Diamond's estimation for the number of original inhabitants is also widely considered an exaggeration, with the number now believed to be close to 100. Since pre-industrial societies are believed to have grown at a maximum of 0.5% per year, one would expect to find roughly 2200 people at the time of Roggeveen's journey. Indeed, this number matches quite closely estimates given by 18th-century explorers.

Claims that the construction of Maoi led to deforestation have also been questioned, with Boersema arguing that the islanders only 15 trees would have been needed to move the statues. With only 493 Maoi on the island, Boersema estimates that 15 trees were cut down every two years for transportation. Current mainstream estimates for the number of trees initially present on the island put upwards of 16 million, far too few to lead to deforestation by the means previous anthropologists have suggested. Bregman, following Boersema's lead, suggests the true deforestation culprit is the Polynesian rat. "In three years, a single pair can breed up to 17 million offspring", making the species a serious threat to any community it finds its way into. Work by archeologist Mara Mulrooney, however, undermines the view that deforestation was even a problem for the Easter Islanders in the first place. Before, through, and after deforestation, islanders were able to increase their food production through methods of land-management.

The true disaster to befall Easter Island, according to Bregman, was the arrival of Europeans. When first landing on the island, Roggeveen and his men opened fire on the natives, killing ten and leaving their bodies behind as a warning to the natives. Fifty years later, Spanish explorer Don Felipe Gonzales claimed the island for his nation, leaving figures of the Christian Cross all over the island, having first announced his arrival in a brilliant display of celebratory canon fire. When James Cook arrived on the island in 1774, many Maoi had toppled and fallen into a state of disrepair. Modern anthropologists have advanced two theories about why the islanders lost interest in the Moai. Firstly, the islanders may have needed a new hobby after the forests were lost. And secondly, there is evidence of the islanders having formed a cargo cult, an obsession with Western explorers and the trinkets they left behind. These two theories are not mutually exclusive.

From this story, Bregman draws a few lessons. Primarily, Bregman finds the story illustrative of human resilience. Contrary to the narrative spun by the explorers who encountered them, the islanders found ways to keep their culture alive and their community growing through many centuries of hardship. Secondly, in Bregman's opinion, the story is one of many examples whereby pessimistic views on humanity have been supported by fabrication. Without fabrication, there would not be enough stories to support the cynical worldview. Lastly, Bregman thinks this way of thinking about history and human agency can produce a nocebo effect whereby we doom ourselves to the very disaster we wish to prepare for, climate change activists being the chief example.

Part II: After Auschwitz 
Referencing Adorno's famous "after Auschwitz" phrase, Bregman recognizes that his hopeful hypothesis of human nature runs into a severe snag if it cannot address true horrors, namely the Holocaust. Mainstream theories on human nature in society, the discipline, came to the ideas which have defined the common sense view of who we are in essence during the 1960s and 70s, their answer being that, in the right circumstances, anyone could become evil. Bregman contends, however, that while these views have become the commonsensical ideas the majority of us today hold, today's social psychologists have brought serious scrutiny to bear on that defining early work. This part of Humankind addresses the Stanford Prison Experiment, Stanley Milgram's electric shock experiment, and the Bystander Effect.

In the Basement of Stanford University 
Drawing parallels to the Robbers Cave experiment and its predecessor, Bregman accuses the infamous Stanford Prison Experiment of being both faulty and fraudulent, stating that "Philip Zimbardo's study wasn't just questionable. It's a hoax." The experiment, it is often believed, set out to examine how people act of their own volition when split into roles of authority and submission (prison guard and prisoner, in this case). It is also commonly thought that the study concluded that those in the position of authority would not only give in to the sadism that is expected of their role, but they will also do so gleefully. So serious is the drive to cruelty that the test's administrator, Philip Zimbardo, found himself caught up in the excitement of it all despite not being a part of the experiment himself. These understandings of the study, however, are not the case and reflect the spin put on things by Zimbardo himself allegedly in his bid for self-promotion.

Zimbardo had repeatedly said in interviews that the guards in his experiment became sadists on their own initiative and made up rules to reach those sadistic ends. However, his book on the study mentions having met with the guards before the experiment started, giving them detailed instructions on dehumanizing their prisoners entirely and breaking their spirits. He also positioned himself as the guards' leader here at the beginning of the test, despite having stated in public that this development happened organically. These actions violate the standards of social scientific practice because it violates the principle that participants in a study ought not to know the purpose of the study, lest they display "demand characteristics." Participants meet these demand characteristics because they believe it is expected of them in the study, typically thinking that not doing these actions would invalidate the research. The guards, primed to believe their cruelty was necessary for the test's success, did so not because they wanted to but because they believed it was what was needed.

Despite this, the guards still displayed reluctance to carry out the actions demanded of them. "Two thirds refused to join in on the sadistic games. One third actually remained kind to the prisoners, to the great frustration of Zimbardo and his colleagues." That the guards did so not only of their own accord but actively against the wishes of the test administrator suggests that humans do not have a natural inclination for brutality, we instead have a pronounced aversion to it. Participants remained with the study as long as they did not because they enjoyed the experience but because they were paid only after the study's conclusion. However, one prisoner became fed up with the experiment once it was revealed that, contrary to his expectations, he would not be allowed to study for his schooling while participating. On the second day, this prisoner decided to fake a mental breakdown so that he would be permitted leave. This breakdown, filmed by Zimbardo, has become the most famous soundbite of the whole event, even though the breakdown was a fabrication.

In 2001, the BBC attempted to replicate the study and air it on TV to cash in on the reality show craze of the time. The social scientists approached and asked to carry out the study agreed, but only on the conditions that they have total control over the study and an ethics board who could intervene should things turn ugly. Unlike Zimbardo's original study, guards were left to their own devices. The result was a show panned by critics for being completely uneventful and an utter bore. On day two of the experiment, the guards decided to share their high-quality food with the inmates in a bid to improve the mood. Prisoners escaped from their cells on day six and joined guards for a cigarette break. Finally, on day seven, the prisoners voted to start a commune, which the guards peaceably accepted and joined. The original parameters of the study having now not only been violated but torn down, the study was brought to a close. Where the BBC had hoped to show the savage waiting to be unleashed in the heart of every civilized man, they instead revealed that, when allowed to, people overwhelmingly choose friendship over conflict.

Stanley Milgram and the Shock Machine 
In 1961, Dr. Stanley Milgram, professor of psychology at Yale University, performed what is perhaps the only social psychology experiment more famous than the Stanford Prison Experiment. In it, subjects were asked to participate in a test examining the effects of punishment on memory. In reality, the study attempted to discover how seriously people were willing to harm others simply because they were ordered to by an authority figure of authority. Infamously unethical, the study nevertheless has been thought to have produced significant results, revealing the extent to which people are, at base, unthinking automatons willing to perpetuate the worst evils when it is demanded of them by individuals in positions of power. When asked, a full 65% of participants were willing to doll out the maximum punishment possible, a 450 volt electrical shock, to the helpless victim. This is despite the fact that the machine featured a prominent "danger" label noting that anything past 350 volts was well into territory no longer safe for humans.

Despite its fame, many flaws in the study's methodology are now well known by professionals in the field and thought to have fatally undermined its credibility. A mere 56% of participants thought the punishment they were administering was even real, the other have unconvinced their actions resulted in much anything, let alone pain. Their willingness to administer "shocks" is therefore unsurprising and uninformative. Of the 56% who did believe the punishments were authentic, nearly all were only willing to administer the shock when it was emphasized to them repeatedly that their participation was crucial for the study's success, for the advancement of a worthy scientific cause. Intimidation and appeals to authority, on the contrary, seemed to have little effect. Rather than possessing a natural inclination towards submission to authority, Bregman suggests instead that people have a natural tendency to want to contribute to good causes; in this case, to the pool of scientific knowledge.

Reception 
Reception to Humankind: A Hopeful History was largely positive, although many reviewers have been critical of Bregman's use of sources. Some anthropologists have accused the book of flattening the complexities and diversity of world cultures, although often with the caveat that Bregman's flattening is more accurate than the alternative flattening he argues against. Bregman has, in turn, defended himself on this point by stating that he intended to offer a different perspective on evidence that is, in itself, inconclusive. He maintains that when the context of broader evidence outside of strict anthropology is considered, the evidence supports the thrust of his argument.

In a positive review of the book in Philosophy Now, Tim Moxham said that Bregman "is seeking to unchain us from a dogmatically pessimistic perception of human nature. I believe that he has achieved this." While remaining somewhat unpersuaded of Bregman's position in totality, Moxman argues that this too is keeping with his intentions in writing, saying that "the book's intention is to make you question, and that is absolutely what it does." In the Guardian, Andrew Anthony writes that "there's a great deal of reassuring human decency to be taken from this bold and thought-provoking book and a wealth of evidence in support of the contention that the sense of who we are as a species has been deleteriously distorted." Kirkus Reviews says Humankind: A Hopeful History provides a "powerful argument in favor of human virtue" and "[makes] a convincing case that we're not so bad." Jennifer Bort Yacovissi, writing in the Washington Independent Review of Books, says of Humankind: A Hopeful History that it "makes a compelling and much-needed argument for the innate decency of humans", praising Bregman for "deconstructing the bad science and lazy reportage that has misrepresented primitive societies as being more bloodthirsty and self-destructive than modern civilized ones." She also commends the book for its thorough critiques of how many popular sociological studies are misrepresented in college courses.

In addition to this praise, Humankind: A Hopeful History did receive some criticism, with most criticism directed at the dichotomy set up by Bregman between what he calls the "veneer theory" of human nature, the idea that civilization applies a thin layer of civility atop beings whose true nature is chaotic, and the ideas for which Bregman himself advocates, primarily identified with the thought of Jean-Jacques Rousseau. In Medisch Contact, the doctor Dolf Algra points out, among other things, a careless reference to sources (the book contains no index) and the incompleteness of his source research. Simon Burgers, lecturer in research skills and critical thinking at Haagse Hogeschool, alleges that the argumentation in the book is characterized by circular reasoning and cherry picking. The sociologist Kees van Oosten believes that the 10 precepts recommended by Bregman in his book play into the hands of evil rulers in the world: "That is why I think that his book is no good and is just opium for the people." Steven Poole argues in The Guardian that Bregman fails to offer an explanation for the Holocaust, notably the actions of the Nazi leaders themselves. David Livingstone Smith concludes in The Philosopher that although Bregman's project is well-intentioned, it is poorly executed: "Shorn of its essentialism, its blurring of the difference between normative and descriptive claims, its huge inferential leaps and unwarranted assertions, Bregman's project might have made a useful contribution to moral psychology. But as it stands, sadly, the book does not succeed."

References

See also 

 
 

2019 non-fiction books
English-language books
Books about the philosophy of history
Anthropology books
Bloomsbury Publishing books
Works about the theory of history